The 1996 Football League Cup Final took place on 24 March 1996 at Wembley Stadium and was contested between Aston Villa and Leeds United. This was the 36th final and the 30th to be played at Wembley and is widely considered to be the toughest final of all time. Aston Villa had won the trophy two years earlier, while Leeds' last victory was in their only final appearance in 1968.

In the first half the teams were separated by a goal from Savo Milošević. After half-time, Leeds United tired and Aston Villa took advantage to eventually win 3–0. Goals from Ian Taylor and Dwight Yorke completed the scoring. This was the beginning of the end for Leeds United manager Howard Wilkinson, as he was heckled by the club's fans for his and the team's failure. However, it was Villa's fifth success in the competition, at the time equalling the record set by Liverpool.

Road to Wembley

Match details

References

External links
Game facts at soccerbase.com
Full Results from the 1996 Football League Cup competition at soccerbase.com
League Cup 1996 at The English Football Archive

EFL Cup Finals
League Cup Final 1996
League Cup Final 1996
League Cup Final
1996 sports events in London
March 1996 sports events in the United Kingdom